Caspar van Hilten (bef. 1583 – c. 1623) was the editor and publisher of the first Dutch newspaper, the Courante uyt Italien, Duytslandt, &c., printed in Amsterdam from June 14, 1618. He had, in effect, been a press officer for the army of Maurice of Nassau before becoming a publisher. 
His son Jan van Hilten (c.1603–1655) was born in Hamburg, presumably when Caspar was there as a press officer. Van Hilten was a bookseller as well as (or instead of) a publisher. After his death in 1622 or 1623, the business was continued by Jan, who started to publish the weekly newspaper on a regular day (Saturday). In 1649, Jan van Hilten's bookstore was located on the Beursstraat in a house named (In) de geborduuerde Handtschoen ("(In) the Embroidered Glove").

Notes

Year of birth unknown
1623 deaths
17th-century newspaper publishers (people)
Low Countries newspaper publishers, pre-1795 (people)
Dutch booksellers
Year of birth uncertain